Poplar Ridge is an unincorporated community in Darke County, in the U.S. state of Ohio.

History
Poplar Ridge was laid out on the Greenville and West Milton Pike. A post office called Poplar Ridge was established in 1850, and remained in operation until 1899

References

Unincorporated communities in Darke County, Ohio
Unincorporated communities in Ohio